Gennifer Hutchison (born ) is an American television and film writer. She is best known for her work on the television series Breaking Bad. She won two Writers Guild of America Awards for her work on the series as a part of the writing team in 2012 and 2013. She was also a writer and executive producer on Better Call Saul.

Prior to Breaking Bad, she worked in the production staff for the television series The Lone Gunmen, The X-Files, Star Trek: Enterprise, Grey's Anatomy and Mad Men. She also worked on The Strain as a writer and producer during its first season.

Career 
Hutchison got her start in the entertainment industry as a PA in the writers' office at The X-Files. She went on to become writer/producer Vince Gilligan's assistant during the show's final seasons. After the show ended, she worked on a number of pilots and short-lived shows as a writers' assistant and producers' assistant, ending up as showrunner Matthew Weiner's assistant on Mad Men during its first season.

After finding out about former boss Gilligan's new pilot Breaking Bad – also on AMC – she reached out and was offered a job as Gilligan's assistant. When Hutchison and the show returned for its second season, she spoke to Gilligan about her ambition to write for the show. She was tasked with writing the show's additional content, such as webisodes and blogs, as an audition. Her work impressed Gilligan, and she was offered a freelance script in season three, and subsequently brought on board as a writer. She remained on the show for the remainder of its run, rising to the position of executive story editor in the show's fifth and final season.

After Breaking Bad ended, she spent a season as a producer on FX's horror-drama The Strain, writing two of the show's first-season episodes.

She rejoined Gilligan and his co-creator Peter Gould on Breaking Bad prequel Better Call Saul as a supervising producer. Hutchison has, to date, written two episodes per season, rising to co-executive producer in season two, and executive producer in season three. She has received an Emmy nomination in the Outstanding Drama Series category for each season of the show.

In film, Hutchison adapted Victoria Aveyard's novel Red Queen for Universal in 2015. In June 2016, she signed an overall deal with Sony Pictures TV, the studio behind both Breaking Bad and Better Call Saul.

In December 2017, it was announced that Hutchison is adapting the Welcome to Night Vale podcast for television. The series is being developed at FX, under her overall deal with Sony Pictures TV.

Personal life 
Hutchison was born in Concord, Massachusetts, and grew up in a military family that moved frequently. She is married to Breaking Bad associate producer/post-production supervisor Andrew Ortner.

Awards

Filmography 
Writer

Production staff

References

External links

American television writers
American women television writers
Living people
Screenwriters from Massachusetts
21st-century American women
Year of birth missing (living people)